Ciné+ is a set of thematic pay television channels broadcasting movies. They are published by MultiThématiques (Canal+ Group) and are distributed by the CanalSat satellite TV as well as cable and ADSL via Numericable CANALSATDSL. Channels broadcast all foreign films in their original language on a secondary audio channel with two subtitling tracks in French, one for translation from a foreign language and the other for the hearing impaired.

Channels
 Ciné+ Premier - recent films and great box office movies
 Ciné+ Frisson - action, horror and fantasy movies
 Ciné+ Émotion - love movies, drama, romantic and sentimental comedy
 Ciné+ Famiz - child and family oriented movies
 Ciné+ Club - independent films and world cinema
 Ciné+ Classic - classic movies
 Ciné+ Star (former) - films with great actors, mainly from the 1980s and 1990s
 Ciné+ Western
 Ciné+ Horreur
 Ciné+ British
 Ciné+ de Quartier
 Ciné+ Crime
 Ciné+ Comédie
 Ciné+ 80's
 Ciné+ Romance
 Ciné+ Asie
 Ciné+ Animé
 Ciné+ Italie
 Ciné+ 90's
 Ciné+ De Funès
 Ciné+ En Musique
 Ciné+ 70's
 Ciné+ BERGMAN
 Ciné+ 60's
 Ciné+ Bollywood
 Ciné+ Deneuve
 Ciné+ Enquêtes
 Ciné+ Histoire
 Ciné+ Splendid
 Ciné+ À table !

See also
Canal+ Group

References

External links
Official Website

Television stations in France
MultiThématiques
Television channels and stations established in 1991
1991 establishments in France